The European Association for Machine Translation is the European branch of the International Association for Machine Translation . It is a non-profit organisation and organises conferences and workshops on the subject of machine translation. It was registered in 1991 in Switzerland and is the only organisation of its type in Europe.

External links
European Association for Machine Translation official website
Association for Machine Translation in the Americas
Asia-Pacific Association for Machine Translation

Machine translation
Translation organizations